Marithé + François Girbaud is an international clothing company based in France and founded by stylists François Girbaud and Marithé Bachellerie in 1972. They created several brands : Compagnie des montagnes et des forêts, Ça, Closed, Matricule 11342, etc.
They are world-known especially for industrialization of the stonewash (stone washing process), baggy trousers and skin-tight jeans.

History
The fashion duo began their career working in the Parisian clothes shop Western House, in 1964. Then Maurice Chorenslup, Pierre Zelcer and Jacques Rozenker helped the couple to create their first brands.

The 1980s to 1990s were the decades of biggest successes for the French brand, with a $900 million worldwide turnover. In 2010, the group was still generating €200 million of revenue.

In 1983, the Girbaud duo created costumes for Jennifer Beals and Michael Nouri, actors in the Flashdance movie.

In 1992, Kris Kross, the rap/hip hop duo known for hit song "Jump", were wearing Girbaud's jeans in their music video.

In June 2012, it was reported that Girbaud had filed for bankruptcy and that its websites were down.

In 2015, Marithé Bachellerie and François Girbaud created a new company named Mad Lane (an itinerant concept store) but were still using the original name Marithé + François Girbaud.

Filmography 
 2016 : Marithé + François = Girbaud : film documentary directed by Jérémie Carboni starring Marithé Bachellerie, François Girbaud, Renzo Rosso (CEO of Diesel brand), Benjamin Cotto from Lilly Wood and the Prick band, Jacques Rozenker, Jennifer Beals, etc. Songs are from Moriarty band

References

External links
 Official Website

Clothing brands of France
Clothing companies of France
Jeans by brand
Watch manufacturing companies of France